Myopalladin is a protein that in humans is encoded by the MYPN gene. Myopalladin is a muscle protein responsible for tethering proteins at the Z-disc and for communicating between the sarcomere and the nucleus in cardiac and skeletal muscle

Structure 

Myopalladin is a 145.2 kDa protein composed of 1320 amino acids. Myopalladin has five Ig-like repeats within the protein, and a proline-rich domain. Myopalladin binds the Src homology domain of nebulette and nebulin and tethers it to alpha-actinin via its C-terminal domain binding to the EF hand domains of alpha-actinin. The N-terminal region of myopalladin binds to the nuclear protein CARP, known to regulate gene expression in muscle. It also has been shown to bind ANKRD23.

Function 

Myopalladin has dual subcellular localization, residing in both the nucleus and sarcomere/I-bands in muscle. Accordingly, myopalladin has functions in both sarcomere assembly and in control of gene expression. Specifics of these functions were gleaned from studies involving MYPN mutants associated with various cardiomyopathies. The Q529X myopalladin mutant demonstrated incompetence in recruiting key binding partners such as desmin, alpha-actinin and CARP to the Z-disc during myofibrilogenesis. In contrast, the Y20C mutant resulted in decreased expression of binding partners.

Clinical significance 

Mutations in MYPN have been linked to nemaline myopathy, dilated cardiomyopathy, hypertrophic cardiomyopathy and restrictive cardiomyopathy.

References

Further reading 

 
 
 
 
 
 

Proteins
Genes